A bridge to nowhere is a bridge where one or both ends are broken or incomplete and does not lead anywhere.

Bridge to Nowhere may refer to:

Bridges
 The Alaskan bridge to nowhere, more properly known as the Gravina Island Bridge, a proposed bridge often cited in the 2000s as an example of pork-barrel spending by the U.S. federal government
 Bridge to Nowhere (San Gabriel Mountains), north of Azusa, California, USA
 Bridge to Nowhere (New Zealand), in Whanganui National Park, North Island

Film
 The Bridge to Nowhere, a 2009 film by Blair Underwood
 Bridge to Nowhere (film), a 1986 film by Ian Mune

Books and comics
 The Bridge to Nowhere (novel), a 1993 novel by Megan McDonald
 Bridge to Nowhere, a 1989 novel by Yvonne Whittal
 The Bridge to Nowhere, a 1986 story in The Transformers published by Marvel Comics

Songs
 "Bridge to Nowhere" (song), by Sam Roberts, 2006
 "Bridge to Nowhere", by the Like from Are You Thinking What I'm Thinking?, 2005

See also
 Road to nowhere (disambiguation)